Huan Blackleach (or Hugh Blackleach), O.S.A. (died 1509) was a pre-Reformation cleric who served as the Bishop of Sodor and Man from 1487 to 1509.

An Austin friar from Asheridge, Buckinghamshire, he was appointed the bishop of the diocese of Sodor and Man by Pope Innocent VIII on 4 April 1487. After serving the see for twenty-two years, he died in office in 1509.

References 

 
 
 
 
 

1509 deaths
16th-century English Roman Catholic bishops
Augustinian friars
Bishops of Sodor and Man
People from Buckinghamshire (before 1974)
Year of birth unknown
15th-century English Roman Catholic bishops